Stepney, also referred to as Stepney Village and Upper Stepney, is a district of the town of Monroe, Connecticut, and on the Connecticut State Register of Historic Places. It was listed as a census-designated place prior to the 2020 census.

First settled around 1720, Stepney was originally a productive farming community made up of transplants from settlements to the south such as Fairfield and Stratford. In the early 19th century, Stepney became a transportation hub for travelers going to and from the city of Danbury and the Greater Bridgeport areas as travelers followed the Bridgeport and Newtown Turnpike, the first paved road in the town of Monroe, and along Hattertown Road.

Once a depot for the Housatonic Railroad, and home to the town of Monroe's first fire department, the Stepney Volunteer Fire Department, today Stepney is home to over a dozen historic buildings dating from before the 20th century, and is predominantly a suburban community with the majority of its business located along the Route 25 corridor.

References

External links
Save Our Stepney task force

Monroe, Connecticut
Neighborhoods in Connecticut
Historic districts in Fairfield County, Connecticut
Populated places in Fairfield County, Connecticut
Census-designated places in Fairfield County, Connecticut
Census-designated places in Connecticut